In geomorphology, a col is the lowest point on a mountain ridge between two peaks. It may also be called a gap. Particularly rugged and forbidding cols in the terrain are usually referred to as notches. They are generally unsuitable as mountain passes, but are occasionally crossed by mule tracks or climbers' routes. The term col tends to be associated more with mountain rather than hill ranges. It is derived from the French col ("collar, neck") from Latin collum, "neck".

The height of a summit above its highest col (called the key col) is effectively a measure of a mountain's topographic prominence. Cols lie on the line of the watershed between two mountains, often on a prominent ridge or arête. For example, the highest col in Austria, the Obere Glocknerscharte ("Upper Glockner Col"), lies between the Kleinglockner and Grossglockner mountains, giving the Kleinglockner a minimum prominence of 17 metres.

The majority of cols are unnamed and are either never transited or only crossed in the course of negotiating a ridge line. Many double summits are separated by prominent cols. The distinction with other names for breaks in mountain ridges such as saddle, wind gap or notch is not sharply defined and may vary from place to place.

See also

References

External links 

 Illustrated Glossary of Alpine Mountain Landforms: Col. Retrieved 16 August 2015.

Landforms
Oronyms